The Story of Iceland is an album of modern chamber music in multiple styles by violinist and multi-instrumentalist Eyvind Kang, accompanied by a large ensemble that includes guitarist Bill Frisell.

Track listing 
"Story of Iceland: Circle of Fair Karma (Part 1)" (music: Kang) – 1:45
"Story of Iceland: Circle of Fair Karma (Part 2)" (music: Kang) – 15:07
"Story of Iceland: Sweetness of Candy" (music: Kang) – 3:06
"Story of Iceland: Hour of Fair Karma (Part 1)" (music: Kang) – 4:31
"Story of Iceland: Hour of Fair Karma (Part 2)" (music: Kang) – 6:07
"10:10 (The Beloved One)" (music: Kang) – 10:10
"Ayanamsha" (music: Kang) – 2:20

Personnel 
Eyvind Kang - violin, multi-instrumentalist
Bill Frisell - guitar
Lesli Dalaba - trumpet
Courtney Agguire - vocals
Keith Lowe - acoustic bass
Jessica Lurie - flute
Tucker Martine - drums
Bär McKinnon - flute
Paul Moore - cymbals
Kala Ramnath - violin
Evan Schiller - percussion
Nancy Scranton - gamelan
Philip White - Uilleann pipes
Tim Young - guitar, vocals

2000 albums
Eyvind Kang albums
Tzadik Records albums